Jazz for Peanuts: A Retrospective of the Charlie Brown TV Themes is a compilation album released in the U.S. by Peak Records in October 2008. The album is credited to David Benoit and contains a mix of previously released material plus newly recorded songs featured in prime-time animated television specials based on the Peanuts comic strip by Charles M. Schulz.

Critical reception
AllMusic critic Thom Jurek called the album an "odd duck", saying it is "all the better for it". Jurek noted that Benoit "succeeded the late Vince Guaraldi as the musical director for the Peanuts television specials, meaning that his 50th anniversary recording of Guaraldi's music wasn't a simple tribute, but a nod to his predecessor". Jurek also noted that both Benoit's compositions, as well as Guaraldi's classic melodies, "were newly recorded live in the studio, lending them their timeless lyric quality and immediacy of presence". All About Jazz critic Woodrow Wilkins noted how the "symbiotic relationship between pianist David Benoit and Peanuts" is a "blessing for fans of both the animated series and jazz".

Track listing
All songs composed by Vince Guaraldi except where noted.

Personnel
Credits adapted from CD liner notes.

 David Benoit – piano 
 Dave Carpenter – bass 
 John Robinson – drums 
 Christian Scott – trumpet 
 Andy Suzuki – tenor saxophone ; flute 
 Pat Kelley – guitar 
 Wynton Marsalis – trumpet 
 Eric Reed – piano 
 Benjamin Wolfe – double bass 
 Wessell Anderson – alto and soprano saxophones 
 Victor Goines – tenor saxophone and clarinet 
 Wycliffe Gordon – trombone 
 Herlin Riley – drums 
 Dave Brubeck – piano 
 Bobby Militello – flute 
 Chris Brubeck – electric bass 
 Randy Jones – drums 
 Taylor Eigsti – piano 
 Kenny G – soprano saxophone 
 Walter Afanasieff – keyboards 
 Vail Johnson – electric bass 
 Vince Guaraldi – piano 
 Monty Budwig – bass 
 Colin Bailey – drums

References

2008 compilation albums
David Benoit (musician) albums
Peanuts music
Soundtrack compilation albums